Arya  is a 2004 Indian Telugu-language romantic action film written and directed by debutant Sukumar. Produced by Dil Raju under Sri Venkateswara Creations banner, the film stars Allu Arjun, Anu Mehta, and Siva Balaji. The music is composed by Devi Sri Prasad and cinematography is handled by R. Rathnavelu. The plot revolves around Aarya, an outgoing and free-spirited boy falling in love with Geetha, an introverted girl who is on the shield of another person Ajay.

Arya was released  on 7 May 2004, the film received positive response and was commercially successful, grossing  worldwide. It  has developed a cult following over the years. 

Later, the film was dubbed into Malayalam and released under the same title in theatres, and became a commercial sucess in Kerala theatres and Allu Arjun got a huge fandom in Kerala.

It was remade into Bengali (Bangladesh) as Badha, in Odia as Pagala Premi, in Sinhala (Sri Lanka) as Adaraye Namayen and in Tamil as Kutty.  A spiritual sequel titled Arya 2 was released in 2009.

Plot
Geetanjali a.k.a. Geetha, a college student, goes to Kanyakumari on a trip. She finds a poem in a diary left on a beach and signs in it, saying that she wishes the poet will succeed in his love. Later on, her anklet falls into the ocean, and a guy jumps into the water in front of her eyes, but no one sees him resurfacing. However, Geetha did not see who jumped in the ocean. She dreams about the incident frequently with the idea that the guy who jumped has died, but her friends ask her to forget it.

Back to the present in Vishakhapatnam, here comes Ajay, a spoiled college student and the son of the local MP Avataram. He likes to flirt with beautiful girls and wants them to be his girlfriends. One day he sees Geetha and proposes to her. When she refuses, he threatens to jump from the top of the college building. Being afraid of being held responsible for a death, Geetha accepts the proposal with the thought that as some guy has already died for her, and she doesn't want someone to get hurt because of her and starts dating him. Aarya is a happy-go-lucky guy who enjoys his life with friends and kids. On his first day to the college, he sees Geetha, who was just confessing her love to Ajay, who was at the top of the college building, threatening her. Charmed by her beauty, Aarya falls in love with her and proposes to her. One day Avataram arranges a party in his house, and it so turns out that Ajay introduces Geetha to his father and persuades him to fix their marriage. Ajay's father, who initially pretended to accept his son's marriage with Geetha, turns tables upside down by introducing another girl Lalasa and announces that his son is going to marry Lalasa. He threatens his son not to marry anyone except Lalasa. Being embarrassed by the situation and helpless, Ajay sits down and starts to get frustrated. Aarya, who loves Geetha so much that he never hesitated to help her, decides to bring Ajay to Geetha and helps them elope. On their way, they are followed by Avataram's henchmen. They eventually find a train and get into it.

When they get down of the train in the night, they are shocked to see the leader of Avataram's henchmen, who forces Geetha to come with him, defying his boss' order. On the other hand, Ajay remains helpless, while Aarya fights all the men and finally defeats them, rescuing Ajay and Geetha. They walk on to the nearby town, which happens to be Aarya's hometown. Being tired, the three go to bed.

The next morning they wake up and realize that Ajay is missing. Aarya tries to convince Geetha that Ajay left to win over his father. This leaves private time for Aarya and Geetha, and they grow close to each other. Geetha starts liking Aarya and begins to understand him. When she tries to confess it to him, Ajay and his father return. Avataram agrees to get Ajay married to Geetha.

On the day of the wedding, Geetha finds out that Aarya was the guy who dove into the sea for her anklet and realizes that he came into her life much before Ajay. She realizes that while Ajay blackmailed her into loving him; Aarya just wanted to see her happy. Geetha also realizes that Aarya truly loves her, while Ajay was just acting on his impulse of wanting what he couldn't have. She leaves the wedding hall in tears and confesses her love to Aarya, and they both reconcile with each other, and this time he successfully throws the stone into the Plastic Coke Cup, indicating he truly succeeded in his love.

Cast

 Allu Arjun as Arya
 Anuradha Mehta as Geethanjali aka Geetha
 Siva Balaji as Ajay
 Rajan P. Dev as MP Avataram, Ajay's father
 Subbaraju as Subbu
 Sunil as "Punch" Falaknama, Train Ticket Examiner
 Venu Madhav as Ajay's friend
 Sudha as Geetha's mother
 Vidya as Shanti
 J. V. Ramana Murthi as Priest
 Shravya as one of Arya's young friends
 Babloo as Aarya's friend
 Sandra Jai Chandran as Geetha's friend
 Devi Charan
 Jogi Naidu
 Krishnam Raju
 Srikanth Addala
 Prudhviraj as Reddy (cameo)
 Abhinayasri in item number "Aa Ante Amalapuram"

Production

Sukumar began working on the script of his directorial debut Aarya (2004) in Vishakhapatnam before joining the sets of Vinayak's Dil. Its producer Dil Raju assured that he would produce the film if Dil becomes a commercial success. Sukumar chose to narrate the story of a boy who confess his love to a girl right in the beginning, opposed to films like Darr (1993), Kabhie Haan Kabhie Naa (1994), and Kaadhal Kondein (2003) where the protagonist's love/obsession for the female lead is revealed towards the end, as he found that idea an "obsolete" one. Raju was impressed with Sukumar's script and Allu Arjun was selected as its protagonist after considering Ravi Teja, Nithin, and Prabhas. Anuradha Mehta and Siva Balaji were chosen for the other two lead roles. R. Rathnavelu and Devi Sri Prasad were chosen as the film's director of photography and music director respectively; they both collaborated with Sukumar in many of his future projects.

Soundtrack

The audio was released at a function arranged in song set erected at Nanakrama Guda on the evening of 16 April 2004. Actress Swati Reddy (then an anchor at the time) and music director Devi Sri Prasad anchored this event. Aditya Music produced the audio of this film. K Raghavendra Rao released the audio and gave the first cassette to Pawan Kalyan and Prabhas. The song "Aa Ante Amalapuram" became famous in Andhra Pradesh and certain parts of Maharashtra like Kolhapur, which created Allu Arjun's identity there. The Soundtrack was an Unusual Hit. The success and popularity of the song "Aa Ante Amalapuram" song eventually led to its adaptation in the 2012 Hindi film Maximum.

Reception

Critical reception
Aarya received highly positive reviews from critics. idlebrain.com gave a review stating, "You feel like you are watching a Mani Rathnam film. There is a soul in the film and you end up having a thin layer of tears in your eyes while leaving the theater. This film announces the arrival of Sukumar – director – a class apart. 'Aarya' is a must watch film for all Telugu film lovers. Don't miss it" and rated the film 4/5, calling the film "A class apart". IndiaGlitz gave a review stating "To start with, the hype machine was at work incessantly before the release of the movie. And after watching the film you also feel that there is a movie that is every inch worth its pre-release hype. Not only Aarya is expected to lead the pack in the long summer of seemingly never-ending releases but also give the hero of the film, Allu Arjun, a new identity. Aarya is an unabashed package showcasing Allu Arjun and his dancing and fighting abilities. The thing it looks like it will work at the box-office", further calling the film "A cocktail of fun and more fun". fullhyderabad.com gave a review stating "Aarya is not at all what you expect it to be. It is a special package that consists of fun, entertainment, laughs, frolic, merriment, high times, bashes and more. It has them all. Romance, eternal love, mush, flowers, embraces, sacrifices, sunsets. It has them ALL. Action, fights, stunts, feats, tricks, battles, blood, bullies, henchmen, chases. Did we mention that this has it all? Emotions, sentiments, passion, craze and feelings. See one. See all," and rated the film 7/10.

Box office
The film ran a 50-day run in 89 centres and a 100-day run in 56 centres.

Awards
52nd Filmfare Awards
Best Director – Sukumar 
2004 CineMAA Awards
Best Director (Jury) – Sukumar
Best Screenplay - Sukumar
Best Editor - Marthand K Venkatesh
Sensational Producer - Dil Raju
2004 Nandi Awards
Best Screenplay Writer – Sukumar
Special Jury – Allu Arjun
Best Fight Master - Ram-Lakshman
Best Male Playback Singer - Sagar
2004 Santosham Film Awards
Santosham Best Young Performers Award – Allu Arjun
Best first film Director - Sukumar
Best new Female Singer - Malathi
Best Costumer - Kumar
Best item Dancer - Abhinayasri
2004 Gemini TV Awards
Best Director – Sukumar
Best Actor – Allu Arjun

References

Bibliography

External links
 

2004 films
Telugu films remade in other languages
Films directed by Sukumar
Films scored by Devi Sri Prasad
2000s Telugu-language films
Indian romantic comedy films
2004 romantic comedy films
Films shot in Visakhapatnam
2004 directorial debut films
Indian romantic action films
2000s romantic action films
Sri Venkateswara Creations films